Giovanni Pérez Rodríguez (born 26 May 1984), commonly known as Gio, is a Spanish footballer who plays as a forward.

Football career
Gio was born in El Cotillo, Fuerteventura, Canary Islands. After having unsuccessfully graduated from Valencia CF's youth system – he only appeared for the reserves – he went on to play the vast majority of his career in the lower leagues, representing CD Alcoyano, UE Lleida, AD Ceuta, Racing Club Portuense, UD Fuerteventura, AEC Manlleu, CD Atlético Baleares, Burjassot CF (two spells), Ontinyent CF, CD Acero, Pego CF and CF Gandía.

In the 2011 summer, Gio signed with Austrian club SKN St. Pölten for his first professional experience, but returned to his country in the immediately following transfer window.

References

External links

1984 births
Living people
People from Fuerteventura
Sportspeople from the Province of Las Palmas
Spanish footballers
Footballers from the Canary Islands
Association football forwards
Segunda División B players
Tercera División players
Valencia CF Mestalla footballers
CD Alcoyano footballers
UE Lleida players
AD Ceuta footballers
AEC Manlleu footballers
CD Atlético Baleares footballers
Ontinyent CF players
SKN St. Pölten players
Spanish expatriate footballers
Expatriate footballers in Austria
CF Gandía players